Silver Thursday was an event that occurred in the United States silver commodity markets on Thursday, March 27, 1980, following the attempt by brothers Nelson Bunker Hunt, William Herbert Hunt and Lamar Hunt (also known as the Hunt Brothers) to corner the silver market. A subsequent steep fall in silver prices led to panic on commodity and futures exchanges.

Background 

In 1979, the price for silver (based on the London Fix) jumped from $6.08 per troy ounce ($0.195/g) on January 1, 1979, to a record high of $49.45 per troy ounce ($1.590/g) on January 18, 1980, an increase of 713%, with silver futures reaching an intraday COMEX all-time high of $50.35 per troy ounce and a reduction of the gold/silver ratio down to 1:17.0. On that day, gold also peaked at $850 per troy ounce. In the last nine months of 1979, the Hunt brothers were estimated to be holding over 100 million troy ounces of silver and several large silver futures contracts.

The brothers were estimated to hold one third of the entire world supply of silver not held by governments. The situation for other prospective purchasers of silver was so dire that on March 26, 1980, the jeweller Tiffany's took out a full page ad in The New York Times, condemning the Hunt Brothers and stating "We think it is unconscionable for anyone to hoard several billion, yes billion, dollars' worth of silver and thus drive the price up so high that others must pay artificially high prices for articles made of silver".

On January 7, 1980, in response to the Hunts' accumulation, the exchange rules regarding leverage were changed; COMEX adopted "Silver Rule 7", which placed heavy restrictions on the purchase of commodities on margin. The Hunt brothers had borrowed heavily to finance their purchases, and, as the price began to fall again, dropping over 50% in just four days, they were unable to meet their obligations, causing panic in the markets.

Climax 

The Hunt brothers had invested heavily in futures contracts through several brokers, including the brokerage firm Bache Halsey Stuart Shields, later Prudential-Bache Securities and Prudential Securities.  When the price of silver dropped below their minimum margin requirement, they were issued a margin call for $100 million.  The Hunts were unable to meet the margin call, and, with the brothers facing a potential $1.7 billion loss, the ensuing panic was felt in the financial markets in general, as well as commodities and futures. Many government officials feared that if the Hunts were unable to meet their debts, some large Wall Street brokerage firms and banks might collapse.

To save the situation, a consortium of US banks provided a $1.1 billion line of credit to the brothers which allowed them to pay Bache which, in turn, survived the ordeal. The U.S. Securities and Exchange Commission (SEC) later launched an investigation into the Hunt brothers, who had failed to disclose that they in fact held a 6.5% stake in Bache.

Stock market reaction 

This day marked the end of a large stock market correction that year.

Aftermath 

The Hunts lost over a billion dollars through this incident, but the family fortunes survived. They pledged most of their assets, including their stake in Placid Oil, as collateral for the rescue loan package they obtained. However, the value of their assets (mainly holdings in oil, sugar, and real estate) declined steadily during the 1980s, and their estimated net wealth declined from $5 billion in 1980 to less than $1 billion in 1988. By 1982, the London Silver Fix had collapsed by 90% to $4.90 per troy ounce.

In 1988, the brothers were found responsible for civil charges of conspiracy to corner the market in silver. They were ordered to pay $134 million in compensation to a Peruvian mineral company that had lost money as a result of their actions. This forced the brothers to declare bankruptcy, in one of the biggest such filings in Texas history.

See also 

 List of trading losses
 Silver as an investment
 State Reserves Bureau copper scandal
 Sumitomo copper affair

References

Further reading 
 Fay, Stephen (1982). The Great Silver Bubble. London: Coronet, 1983. .
 Jerry W. Markham (2002). A financial history of the United States: From the age of derivatives into the new millennium: (1970–2001), volume 3, M. E. Sharpe,  

Silver
March 1980 events in the United States
Commodity markets
Wealth in the United States
Economic bubbles